Cathedral of Saint George in Prizren is the Cathedral church of the Serbian Orthodox Eparchy of Raška and Prizren, located in the town of Prizren, Kosovo. It was built from 1856 to 1887, near the Old Church of Saint George, previous cathedral church of the same eparchy. The cathedral was burned and severely damaged by Albanian mobs during the 2004 unrest, but was later renovated.

History

Modern Serbian Orthodox Cathedral of Saint George in Prizren was built in the second half of the 19th century, during the Ottoman rule in the region. Initiative for the creation of a new cathedral church was launched during the first half of the 19th century, and only after long negotiations with Ottoman authorities final permission was obtained in 1855, and foundation was laid in 1856. Up to that point, minor Old Church of Saint George served as a temporary cathedral church of the Eparchy of Raška and Prizren, since Ottoman authorities previously took over the ancient medieval Cathedral of the Holy Mother of God (Bogorodica Ljeviška) in Prizren, and turned it into a mosque. Local leaders of Eastern Orthodox Christians knew that ancient cathedral will not be returned to them as long as Prizren is under Ottoman rule, and therefore decided to build a new cathedral. Foundations were laid in 1856, but construction was completed in 1887. Prolonged construction was caused by constant financial and administrative difficulties.

After the consecration of the new cathedral in 1887, additional efforts were undertaken in order to complete the internal inventory and decoration of the church. Significant acquisitions were made during the tenure of metropolitan Dionisije Petrović of Raška and Prizren (1896-1900), and his successor, metropolitan Nićifor Perić (1901-1911). Both of them were Serbian Orthodox hierarchs, appointed by the Ecumenical Patriarchate of Constantinople.

Major turning point in the history of the Cathedral occurred at the beginning of the First Balkan War (1912—1913). In the autumn of 1912, Prizren was annexed by the Kingdom of Serbia. In the spring of 1913, rector of the Serbian Orthodox Seminary of Prizren, protopresbyter Stevan Dimitrijević was appointed as administrator of the Eparchy. Under the Treaty of London (1913), Albanian-majority Prizren was officially annexed to Serbia. During the First World War (1914-1918), the region was occupied by the armies of the Central Powers from the end of 1915 up to the autumn of 1918. After the liberation in 1918, new Kingdom of Serbs, Croats and Slovenes (Yugoslavia) was created, and included all territories of Serbia. After the Serbian Patriarchate was renewed in 1920, Eparchy of Raška and Prizren was returned to the jurisdiction of the Serbian Orthodox Church, and the Cathedral of Saint George in Prizren was confirmed as the official cathedral church of the Eparchy.

In 1941, Kingdom of Yugoslavia was attacked and occupied by Nazi Germany and its allies. The central parts of the Eparchy of Raška and Prizren, including the city of Prizren, were occupied by Italians. Formally, Italian occupation zone was annexed to Fascist Albania. That marked the beginning of mass persecution of some ethnic groups in Prizren, and other annexed regions of Metohija (Dukagjini) and central Kosovo. During that period, many Serbian churches of the Eparchy of Raška were looted and destroyed by the Italian army,.

Unrest of 2004 and restoration 
After the Kosovo War (1999), territory of Kosovo including Prizren, was placed under the administration of the United Nations Interim Administration Mission in Kosovo. During the unrest of 2004, Serbian Orthodox Cathedral of Saint George in Prizren was looted and set on fire by local Muslim extremists. Only after many difficulties, the cathedral was gradually restored during next few years. On 26 December 2010, newly elected Serbian Orthodox bishop Teodosije Šibalić was enthroned in the restored cathedral in Prizren, by the Serbian Patriarch Irinej. In July 2012, the cathedral was visited by Ban Ki-moon, the Secretary-General of the United Nations. In March 2016, British royal delegation, led by Charles, Prince of Wales, also visited the cathedral.

See also
 Destruction of Serbian heritage in Kosovo

Notes

References

Sources

External links

 Official pages of the Serbian Orthodox Eparchy of Raška and Prizren
 SOC (2010): Ethronement ceremony of newly-elected Bishop Teodosije of Raska-Prizren in Prizren
 SOC (2014): Feast day of Saint George the Great Martyr in Prizren
 SOC (2016): Prince Charles visited the Cathedral church of Saint George in Prizren

 

19th-century Serbian Orthodox church buildings
Serbian Orthodox cathedrals in Kosovo
Protected Monuments of Culture
Churches destroyed by Muslims
Cultural heritage of Kosovo
Churches destroyed by arson
Churches completed in 1887
Churches in Prizren
Cultural heritage monuments in Prizren District